Mohammed El-hadhiri is a member of the Pan-African Parliament from Libya.

References

Notes 

The name is also transliterated as Mohamed Elmadani El-Houderi

Members of the Pan-African Parliament from Libya
Living people
Year of birth missing (living people)